The 1949 College Football All-America team is composed of college football players who were selected as All-Americans by various organizations and writers that chose College Football All-America Teams in 1949. The eight selectors recognized by the NCAA as "official" for the 1949 season are (1) the Associated Press, (2) the United Press, (3) the All-America Board, (4) the American Football Coaches Association (AFCA), (5) the Football Writers Association of America (FWAA), (6) the International News Service (INS), (7) the Newspaper Enterprise Association (NEA), and (8) the Sporting News.

Consensus All-Americans
For the year 1949, the NCAA recognizes eight published All-American teams as "official" designations for purposes of its consensus determinations. The following chart identifies the NCAA-recognized consensus All-Americans and displays which first-team designations they received.

All-American selections for 1949

Ends
 Leon Hart, Notre Dame (College Football Hall of Fame) 
 James "Froggy" Williams, Rice (College Football Hall of Fame) 
 Art Weiner, North Carolina (College Football Hall of Fame)
 Dan Foldberg, Army 
 Jim Owens, Oklahoma (College Football Hall of Fame) 
 Ken Rose, Stanford 
 Kenny Powell, North Carolina 
 J. D. Isom, Baylor 
 Bud Sherrod, Tennessee 
 Bud Grant, Minnesota (Pro Football Hall of Fame) 
 Red Wilson, Wisconsin 
 Tom Rowe, Dartmouth

Tackles
 Leo Nomellini, Minnesota (College and Pro Football Hall of Fame) 
 Alvin Wistert, Michigan (College Football Hall of Fame) 
 Wade Walker, Oklahoma 
 James Martin (College Football Hall of Fame), Notre Dame 
 Robert Wahl, Michigan 
 Bob Gain, Kentucky (College Football Hall of Fame)
 Hollie Donan, Princeton (College Football Hall of Fame) 
 Jim Turner, California 
 Thurman "Fum" McGraw, Colorado A&M (College Football of Fame) 
 John Sandusky, Villanova 
 Ray Krouse, Maryland 
 Louis Allen, Duke

Guards
 Rod Franz, California (College Football Hall of Fame) 
 Ed Bagdon, Michigan State 
 Bernie Barkouskie, Pittsburgh
 Stanley West, Oklahoma 
 Vern Sterling, Santa Clara 
 Bull Schweder, Penn 
 Bud McFadin, Texas (College Football Hall of Fame) 
 Don Mason, Michigan State 
 George Toneff, Ohio State 
 Jack Lininger, Ohio State

Centers
 Clayton Tonnemaker, Minnesota (College Football Hall of Fame) 
 Joe Watson, Rice 
 Tom Novak, Nebraska 
 Jim Castagnoli, Stanford 
 Bob Fuchs, Missouri

Backs
 Emil Sitko, Notre Dame (College Football Hall of Fame) 
 Doak Walker, Southern Methodist (SMU) (College and Pro Football Hall of Fame) 
 Arnold Galiffa, Army 
 Bob Williams, Notre Dame (College Football Hall of Fame) 
 Charlie Justice, North Carolina 
 Eddie LeBaron, College of Pacific 
 Eddie Price, Tulane (College Football Hall of Fame) 
 Lynn Chandnois, Michigan State 
 George Thomas, Oklahoma 
 George Sella, Princeton 
 John Papit, Virginia 
 Darrell Royal, Oklahoma 
 Forrest Klein, California 
 Randall Clay, Texas 
 Chuck Ortmann, Michigan 
 Bob Celeri, California 
 Hillary Chollet, Cornell 
 Dick Kempthorn, Michigan 
 Bob Zastrow, Navy 
 Johnny Karras, Illinois 
 Jim Cain, Army

Key
 Bold – Consensus All-American
 -1 – First-team selection
 -2 – Second-team selection
 -3 – Third-team selection

Official selectors
 AP = Associated Press, chosen after recommendations from 250 sports editors, AP staff writers, college coaches, and radio broadcasters
 COL = Collier's Weekly, selected by the American Football Coaches Association
 FWAA = Look magazine, selected by Grantland Rice and the Football Writers Association of America
 INSO/INSD = International News Service offensive and defensive selections
 NEAO/NEAD = Newspaper Editors Association offensive and defensive All-American teams, selected by NEA sports editor Harry Grayson
 SN = Sporting News
 UP = United Press, selected for The United Press by 313 football writers and football broadcasters from all sections of the country

Other selectors
 CP = Central Press Association
 WC = Walter Camp Football Foundation
 NYS = New York Sun
 PLAY = All-Players All-America team, selected by the Chicago Tribune with the cooperation of 112 major colleges, based on the votes of 2,193 college football players. Players were only permitted to vote for players who they played against.

See also
 1949 All-Big Seven Conference football team
 1949 All-Big Ten Conference football team
 1949 All-Pacific Coast Conference football team
 1949 All-SEC football team
 1949 All-Southwest Conference football team

References

All-America Team
College Football All-America Teams